NASA Extreme Environment Mission Operations, or NEEMO, is a NASA analog mission that sends groups of astronauts, engineers and scientists to live in the Aquarius underwater laboratory, the world's only undersea research station, for up to three weeks at a time in preparation for future space exploration.

NASA has used it since 2001 for a series of space exploration simulation missions, usually lasting 7 to 14 days, with space research mainly conducted by international astronauts. The mission had cost about 500 million U.S. dollars. The crew members are called aquanauts (as they live underwater at depth pressure for a period equal to or greater than 24 continuous hours without returning to the surface), and they perform EVAs in the underwater environment. A technique known as saturation diving allows the aquanauts to live and work underwater for days or weeks at a time. After twenty four hours underwater at any depth, the human body becomes saturated with dissolved gas. With saturation diving, divers can accurately predict exactly how much time they need to decompress before returning to the surface. This information limits the risk of decompression sickness. By living in the Aquarius habitat and working at the same depth on the ocean floor, NEEMO crews are able to remain underwater for the duration of their mission.

For NASA, the Aquarius habitat and its surroundings provide a convincing analog for space exploration.
Much like space, the undersea world is a hostile, alien place for humans to live. NEEMO crew members experience some of the same challenges there that they would on a distant asteroid, planet (i.e. Mars) or Moon. During NEEMO missions, the aquanauts are able to simulate living on a spacecraft and test spacewalk techniques for future space missions. Working in space and underwater environments requires extensive planning and sophisticated equipment. The underwater condition has the additional benefit of allowing NASA to "weight" the aquanauts to simulate different gravity environments.

Until 2012, Aquarius was owned by the National Oceanic and Atmospheric Administration (NOAA) and operated by the National Undersea Research Center (NURC) at the University of North Carolina–Wilmington as a marine biology study base.

Since 2013, Aquarius is owned by Florida International University (FIU). As part of the FIU Marine Education and Research Initiative, the Medina Aquarius Program is dedicated to the study and preservation of marine ecosystems worldwide and is enhancing the scope and impact of FIU on research, educational outreach, technology development, and professional training. At the heart of the program is the Aquarius Reef Base.

Missions

NEEMO 1: October 21–27, 2001

NASA Aquanaut Crew:
 Bill Todd, Commander
 Michael L. Gernhardt
 Michael López-Alegría
 Dafydd Williams, CSA

NURC Support Crew:
 Mark Hulsbeck
 Ryan Snow

NEEMO 2: May 13–20, 2002 
NASA Aquanaut Crew:
 Michael Fincke, Commander
 Daniel M. Tani
 Sunita Williams
 Marc Reagan

NURC Support Crew:
 Thor Dunmire
 Ryan Snow

NEEMO 3: July 15–21, 2002 
NASA Aquanaut Crew:
 Jeffrey Williams, Commander
 Gregory Chamitoff
 John D. Olivas
 Jonathan Dory

NURC Support Crew:
 Byron Croker
 Michael Smith

NEEMO 4: September 23–27, 2002 
NASA Aquanaut Crew:
 Scott Kelly, Commander
 Paul Hill
 Rex Walheim
 Jessica Meir

NURC Support Crew:
 James Talacek
 Ryan Snow

NEEMO 5: June 16–29, 2003 
NASA Aquanaut Crew:
 Peggy Whitson, Commander
 Clayton Anderson
 Garrett Reisman
 Emma Hwang

NURC Support Crew:
 James Talacek
 Ryan Snow

NEEMO 6: July 12–21, 2004 
NASA Aquanaut Crew:
 John Herrington, Commander
 Nicholas Patrick
 Douglas H. Wheelock
 Tara Ruttley

NURC Support Crew:
 Craig B. Cooper
 Joseph March
 Marc Reagan, Mission Director

NEEMO 7: October 11–21, 2004 
NASA Aquanaut Crew:
 Robert Thirsk, Commander
 Catherine Coleman
 Michael R. Barratt
 Craig McKinley

NURC Support Crew:
 James Talacek
 Billy Cooksey
 Bill Todd, Mission Director

NEEMO 8: April 20–22, 2005 
NASA Aquanaut Crew:
 Michael L. Gernhardt, Commander
 John D. Olivas
 Scott Kelly
 Monika Schultz

NURC Support Crew:
 Craig B. Cooper
 Joseph March
 Bill Todd, Mission Director

NEEMO 9: April 3–20, 2006 

NASA Aquanaut Crew:
 Dafydd Williams, Commander
 Nicole P. Stott
 Ronald J. Garan Jr.
 Timothy J. Broderick, M.D.

NURC Support Crew:
 James F. Buckley
 Ross Hein
 Marc Reagan, Mission Director

NEEMO 10: July 22–28, 2006 
NASA Aquanaut Crew:
 Koichi Wakata, Commander
 Andrew Feustel
 Karen L. Nyberg
 Karen Kohanowich

NURC Support Crew:
 Mark Hulsbeck
 Dominic Landucci
 Marc Reagan, Mission Director

NEEMO 11: September 16–22, 2006 
NASA Aquanaut Crew:
 Sandra Magnus, Commander
 Timothy Kopra
 Robert L. Behnken
 Timothy Creamer

NURC Support Crew:
 Larry Ward
 Roger Garcia
 Marc Reagan, Mission Director

NEEMO 12: May 7–18, 2007 

NASA Aquanaut Crew:
 Heidemarie Stefanyshyn-Piper, Commander
 José M. Hernández
 Josef Schmid, M.D.
 Timothy J. Broderick, M.D.

NURC Support Crew:
 Dominic Landucci
 James Talacek
 Marc Reagan, Mission Director

NEEMO 13: August 6–15, 2007 
NASA Aquanaut Crew:
 Nicholas Patrick, Commander
 Richard R. Arnold
 Satoshi Furukawa
 Christopher E. Gerty

NURC Support Crew:
 James F. Buckley
 Dewey Smith
 Marc Reagan, Mission Director

NEEMO 14: May 10–23, 2010 
NASA Aquanaut Crew:
 Chris Hadfield, Commander
 Thomas H. Marshburn
 Andrew Abercromby
 Steve Chappell

Aquarius Reef Base support crew:
 James Talacek
 Nate Bender
 Bill Todd, Mission Director

NEEMO 15: October 20–26, 2011 
NASA Aquanaut Crew:
 Shannon Walker, Commander
 Takuya Onishi
 David Saint-Jacques
 Steve Squyres

Aquarius Reef Base support crew:
 James Talacek
 Nate Bender

DeepWorker 2000 submersible crew:
 Stanley G. Love
 Richard R. Arnold
 Michael L. Gernhardt

NEEMO 16: June 11–22, 2012 

NASA Aquanaut Crew:
 Dorothy Metcalf-Lindenburger, Commander
 Kimiya Yui
 Timothy Peake
 Steve Squyres

Aquarius Reef Base support crew:
 James Talacek
 Justin Brown

DeepWorker 2000 submersible crew:
 Stanley G. Love
 Steve Giddings
 Serena M. Auñón
 Bill Todd
 Michael L. Gernhardt
 Andrew Abercromby
 Steve Chappell

SEATEST II: September 9–13, 2013 
Space Environment Analog for Testing EVA Systems and Training
( NEEMO 17 ) Designation skipped

NASA Aquanaut Crew:
 Joseph M. Acaba, Commander
 Kate Rubins
 Andreas Mogensen
 Soichi Noguchi

Aquarius Reef Base support crew:
 Mark Hulsbeck
 Otto Rutten

NEEMO 18: July 21–29, 2014 
NASA Aquanaut Crew:
 Akihiko Hoshide, Commander
 Jeanette J. Epps
 Mark T. Vande Hei
 Thomas Pesquet
Professional habitat technicians, Aquarius Reef Base support crew:
 James Talacek
 Hank Stark (FIU)

NEEMO 19: September 7–13, 2014 

NASA Aquanaut Crew:
 Randolph Bresnik, Commander
 Andreas Mogensen, Flight Engineer 1
 Jeremy Hansen, Flight Engineer 2
 Hervé Stevenin, Flight Engineer 3
Aquarius Reef Base support crew:
 Mark Hulsbeck
 Ryan LaPete

NEEMO 20: July 20 – August 2, 2015 
NASA Aquanaut Crew:

 Luca Parmitano, ESA, commander
 Serena M. Auñón, NASA
 David Coan, NASA EVA Management Office engineer
 Norishige Kanai, JAXA

Professional habitat technicians, Aquarius Reef Base support crew:
 Mark Hulsbeck (FIU)
 Sean Moore (FIU)

NEEMO 20 mission objective was to simulate the time delays associated with sending and receiving commands between controllers on Earth and astronauts on Mars. Additional EVAs will simulate working on the surface of an asteroid, and the use of the DeepWorker submersible as an underwater stand-in for the Multi-Mission Space Exploration Vehicle.

NEEMO 21: July 21 – August 5, 2016 
The NEEMO 21 mission was scheduled to begin July 18, 2016 and conclude August 3, 2016; however, the mission start was shifted to July 21, 2016 as a result of unfavorable weather conditions.

NASA Aquanaut Crew:
 Reid Wiseman, NASA, Commander 1
 Megan McArthur, NASA, Commander 2
 Marc O´Gríofa
 Matthias Maurer, ESA
 Noel Du Toit
 Dawn Kernagis
Professional habitat technicians, Aquarius Reef Base support crew:
 Hank Stark (FIU)
 Sean Moore (FIU)

NEEMO 22: June 18–27, 2017 

NASA Aquanaut Crew:
 Kjell Lindgren, NASA, Commander
 Pedro Duque, ESA
 Trevor Graff, NASA/Jacobs
 Dominic D'Agostino, USF
Professional habitat technicians, Aquarius Reef Base support crew:
 Mark Hulsbeck (FIU)
 Sean Moore (FIU)

NEEMO 23: June 10–22, 2019 

NASA all-female Aquanaut Crew:
 Samantha Cristoforetti, ESA, Commander
 Jessica Watkins,  NASA astronaut candidate
 Csilla Ari D’Agostino, a neurobiologist at the University of South Florida
 Shirley Pomponi, Marine biologist at Harbor Branch Oceanographic Institute of Florida Atlantic University

Professional habitat technicians, Aquarius Reef Base support crew:
 Mark Hulsbeck (FIU)
 Tom Horn (FIU)

See also

References

External links 

 
 NEEMO missions
 Live webcams (subject to mission availability)
 Behind the Scenes: NEEMO

NASA programs
Controlled ecological life support systems
Human analog missions